Thermoactinomyces vulgaris is a species of bacteria.

The species is known to cause Farmer's lung.

References

Bacillales
Pathogenic bacteria
Hypersensitivity pneumonitis